Brooke Buschkuehl (née Stratton; born 12 July 1993) is an Olympic long jumper from Australia. She is the current Australian & Oceanic Record Holder. She qualified for the 2020 Tokyo Olympics. Stratton jumped a distance of 6.6m in her Women's long jump heat and therefore qualified for the final. In the final she improved the distance to 6.8m but this was not sufficient to gain a medal. She came seventh, 0.17m less than the eventual winner, Malaika Mihambo of Germany.

Early years 
Stratton started her career at the Nunawading Little Athletics center at the tender age of 5, following in the footsteps of her 7 year old brother, Jamie. She also competed in athletics at school level for Caulfield Grammar School. Four years later she won the under-9 state title and her success in the long jump continued with the World Youth Championships in 2009 where she placed 10th. She then competed at the world juniors in 2010 and 2012. 

One year later, Stratton was diagnosed with coeliac disease and was found to be gluten intolerant. She had been struggling with fatigue for most of the previous two years. She changed her diet and performance improved. She was selected in the 2014 Commonwealth Games but was forced to withdraw with an injury.

Achievements
Stratton competed at the 2015 World Championships in Beijing leaping 6.64m in the qualifying round but narrowly missed the final. In the 2016 Summer Olympics she finished seventh.

Her personal best in the event is 7.05 metres set at the Perth Track Classic on 12 March 2016, breaking the 14-year-old Australian record held by Bronwyn Thompson.

She was selected for the Australian Athletics team (in long jump) at the 2018 Commonwealth Games on the Gold Coast, Queensland and was placed 2nd with a leap of 6.77m.

Personal life
Stratton is currently studying a Bachelor of Health Sciences at Deakin University.

Competition record

See also
 List of Caulfield Grammar School people

References

External links
 
 Brooke Stratton at Athletics Australia (archive)
 Brooke Stratton at Australian Athletics Historical Results
  (archive)
 
 
 
 
 

1993 births
Living people
Australian female long jumpers
Olympic athletes of Australia
Athletes (track and field) at the 2016 Summer Olympics
Commonwealth Games medallists in athletics
Commonwealth Games silver medallists for Australia
Athletes (track and field) at the 2018 Commonwealth Games
Athletes (track and field) at the 2022 Commonwealth Games
World Athletics Championships athletes for Australia
Athletes from Melbourne
People educated at Caulfield Grammar School
Athletes (track and field) at the 2020 Summer Olympics
20th-century Australian women
21st-century Australian women
People from Box Hill, Victoria
Sportswomen from Victoria (Australia)
Medallists at the 2022 Commonwealth Games